is a department store in Shibuya, Tokyo, Japan. The store is operated by SHIBUYA109 Entertainment Corporation, a subsidiary of the Tokyu Group.

History and description
The building, located just across the street from Shibuya Station, opened in April 1979. The architect was Minoru Takeyama. Tokyu, the building's operator, designed the building as a "Fashion Community" containing small retail stores targeting the early-30s female consumer. Tokyu intended the store to compete with Seibu Department Stores, which was making inroads into the Shibuya area.

The name of the building, 109, is a form of word play (goroawase, specifically numerical substitution) and is taken from the Japanese characters tō (meaning 10) and kyū (9) as in Tōkyū. The interior of the building is designed to move shoppers in a loop on each floor from the elevators past various shops. A movie theater was originally planned for the top floor, but the fire department would not grant approval due to emergency-evacuation routes not meeting appropriate standards. Although originally targeted at women in their 30s, the building later became more known as a sanctuary for young women from the gyaru subculture.

The original emoji set from SoftBank Mobile (as used by iOS prior to the Unicode emoji standardisation) included one for Shibuya 109, . As a corporate icon, it was not assigned a standard Unicode code point, but it continues to be supported by Twemoji at its location in SoftBank's Private Use Area.

Due to its prominent location in Shibuya, the building appears in various Japanese media like anime and video games; however, since 109 is a copyrighted brand, the number is always altered.

Stores
 Shibuya 109 (Shibuya, Tokyo) - April 1979

 MAGNET by Shibuya 109 (Shibuya, Tokyo) - April 2018

Opened as 109-2 in April 1979, renamed to 109Men's in March 2011 before being renamed once again to its current name.
 Kohrinbo 109 (Kanazawa, Ishikawa) - September 1985
 109 Machida (Machida, Tokyo) - July 2002
 Shizuoka 109 (Shizuoka, Shizuoka) - October 2007
 Created in March 2006 as Shibuya 109 Dreams, later recreated into the current 109.
 Minatomirai 109 (Yokohama) - April 2010
 Shibuya 109 Abeno (Osaka) - April 2011

References

External links

 Official website 
 109Men's 
 Kohrinbo 109  
 109 Machida 

1979 establishments in Japan
Shopping malls established in 1979
Buildings and structures in Shibuya
Tokyu Group
Department stores of Japan
Articles with unsupported PUA characters